The Como Roundhouse, Railroad Depot and Hotel Complex is a collection of historic buildings in Como, Colorado.

History
The  narrow gauge Denver, South Park and Pacific Railroad (DSPPR) reached Como in June 1879. 1881 saw construction of the Como Roundhouse, and is believed to have been built by Italian stonemasons that had settled in the Como area.

The original stone section remains, preservation work was undertaken in the 1980s to the walls and roof.

The Depot was constructed in 1879 and soon after extended to its current L shape. The Depot has been restored and is being used as a seasonal museum.

The first Hotel on the site was the Gilman which opened for business on New Year's Eve 1880.

The Gilman was extended in 1882/3 and then taken over by the Union Pacific's hotel division in 1885. They improved the building, rebuilding and extending it. In November 1896 the building burned to the ground.

Part of the foundations and bricks salvaged from the fire were used in building the new existing hotel. Called the South Park Hotel by the Railroad.

The last train through Como was in April 1937, the tracks were pulled up the following year. Track has now been relaid connecting the Depot and Roundhouse and a locomotive, Klondike Kate now resides in the Roundhouse.

References

External links
South Park Rail Society – official website
Como Depot listing on Colorado Preservation, Inc.’s Endangered Places Program
Historic and modern photos of the buildings at The Narrow Gauge Circle

Buildings and structures in Park County, Colorado
Industrial buildings and structures on the National Register of Historic Places in Colorado
Hotel buildings on the National Register of Historic Places in Colorado
Colonial Revival architecture in Colorado
Colorado Mining Boom
National Register of Historic Places in Park County, Colorado
Railroad roundhouses in Colorado
Railway hotels in the United States
Railway stations on the National Register of Historic Places in Colorado
Railway roundhouses on the National Register of Historic Places
Railway depots on the National Register of Historic Places
Railway buildings and structures on the National Register of Historic Places in Colorado
Former railway stations in Colorado